East Ryegate is an unincorporated village in the town of Ryegate, Caledonia County, Vermont, United States. East Ryegate has a post office with ZIP code 05042.

References

Unincorporated communities in Caledonia County, Vermont
Unincorporated communities in Vermont